Tim Sarkes is a film and television producer who is known for his production on Run Ronnie Run!, as well as for Mind of Mencia.

Production
Mr. Show with Bob and David: Fantastic Newness (1996) (co-producer)
Mr. Show with Bob and David (co-producer) (10 episodes, 1995–1996)
Mr. Show and the Incredible, Fantastical News Report (1998) (co-executive producer)
David Cross: The Pride Is Back (1999) (executive producer)
Run Ronnie Run! (2002) (executive producer)
Derek & Simon: A Bee and a Cigarette (2006) (executive producer)
The Pity Card (2006) (executive producer)
Steven Wright: When the Leaves Blow Away (2006) (executive producer)

Actor
Loomis (2001)

References

External links
Tim Starks filmography @ nytimes.com

American television producers
American film producers
Year of birth missing (living people)
Living people